The 1908 United States presidential election in Pennsylvania took place on November 3, 1908, as part of the 1908 United States presidential election, throughout 46 states (Arizona and New Mexico were still territories that would participate in the next election). This was the first presidential election in which Oklahoma participated. Voters chose 34 representatives, or electors to the Electoral College, who voted for president and vice president.

Pennsylvania overwhelmingly voted for the Republican nominee, Secretary of War William Howard Taft, over the Democratic nominee, former U.S. Representative William Jennings Bryan. Taft won Pennsylvania by a landslide margin of 23.43%.

Results

Results by county

See also
 List of United States presidential elections in Pennsylvania

References

Pennsylvania
1908
1908 Pennsylvania elections